The 2018–19 Kuwait Federation Cup tournament saw all 15 Kuwaiti clubs participating in 2 groups, rather than 3.
Kazma SC are the defending champions.

Group stage
Draw held on July 24

Group A

Final standings

Group B

Final standings

References

External links
Kuwaiti Federation Cup 2018/2019, Goalzz.com

Kuwait Federation Cup
Kuwait Federation Cup
Federation Cup